Kacy Anne Hill (born May 1, 1994) is an American singer-songwriter, producer, and former model.

She was born and raised in Phoenix, Arizona and had previously worked as a model for American Apparel. She released "Experience", her first non-album single independently in 2014. She additionally worked as a backup dancer on The Yeezus Tour for American rapper Kanye West, where he discovered her music and signed her to his GOOD Music label "immediately".

Hill released "Foreign Fields", in 2015, which was later included on the Bloo EP, via GOOD Music. Hill was also #6 on Dazed and Confused's Readers' 100 list and #29 on the Dazed 100 list in 2014. In 2016, she was famously featured on rapper Travis Scott's album Rodeo, on the song 90210. She released her debut album Like a Woman in 2017.

Hill announced that she had left GOOD Music in 2019, and independently released her second and third studio albums, Is It Selfish If We Talk About Me Again in 2020, and Simple, Sweet, and Smiling in 2021.

Early life
Hill was raised in Phoenix, Arizona and attended Arizona School for the Arts. Hill has a younger sister, Emma. At an early age, she was influenced by music, playing the oboe and saxophone and singing in choir.

Hill began modelling at the age of 16 after being discovered by a wedding photographer. She moved to Los Angeles after high school to pursue a modelling career, which led to her becoming the face for American Apparel. She got into music when she met a director named Stephen Garnett, who later directed the video for her first non-album single release, Experience. Regarding her modelling career, Hill stated that she never felt passionate about it. In an interview with NY Mag, she was quoted as saying, "It wasn't something I really wanted to do; it was something that was there, so I went after it."

Career

2013–2019: Debut and GOOD Music 
Hill was a backup dancer for Kanye West during his 2013–2014 The Yeezus Tour. She had released Experience, a non-album single at the beginning of the tour. The song was produced by Jaylien Wesley, also known as JAYLIEN. The video for the song was shot in ten minutes between her getting off a plane and going to a tour rehearsal. During the tour, West was provided with a copy of the song and he immediately signed Hill to his GOOD Music label after his show in Atlantic City.

Her song "Experience" received international media attention, with Digital Spy naming it a "track you need to hear" as well as The BoomBox naming Hill an artist to watch in 2015. Hill was also #6 on Dazed and Confused's Readers' 100 list and #29 on the Dazed 100 list in 2014. After the release of "Experience", Hill wrote songs that became part of her debut EP with GOOD Music. Entitled Bloo, the songs were said to be a collection of what Hill wanted to accomplish musically. The Express Tribune named her one of 10 new music artists you are bound to have on repeat. Additional accolades came from GQ who stated "Hill's barrelling towards the big time" and NY Magazine who stated she was "ethereal yet catchy" and "one to watch." Her first major feature was on the song "90210" on Travis Scott's Rodeo.

Hill finished recording her debut album in December 2016. In early May 2017, she released two singles, entitled "Hard to Love", produced by Stuart Price and Oskar Sikow, and "Like a Woman", produced by DJ Mustard, Terrace Martin and DJ Dodger Stadium (DJDS). Both singles were announced as the lead cuts from Hill's debut studio album, Like a Woman, released on 30 June 2017.

In August 2018, Hill independently released the single entitled, "Dinner". In May 2019, Hill announced that she had left GOOD Music on Twitter.

2020–present: Independent releases 
In July 2020, Hill released her second album Is It Selfish If We Talk About Me Again independently, featuring co-production from Hill herself, Francis and the Lights, and BJ Burton, as well as Cashmere Cat, and Hill's now-partner, Jim-E Stack, who inspired a lot of the album's tracks. According to Hill, the album was "Turned down by every label but it means the world to me."  The album was met with favourable reviews from critics with music publication Pitchfork describing it as "Bright and open, built with sounds that move and breathe with the artist". The album has surpassed 15 million streams as of January 2022. She released a remix EP for the album in December 2020. Hill also contributed to Japanese-Australian singer-songwriter Joji's Nectar album in September 2020, co-writing "Like You Do".

Hill began teasing her third album via social media, working on the record alongside Jim-E Stack and John Carroll Kirby. She finished production on the album in July 2021. She released the lead single, "Seasons Bloom", on 27 August 2021, featuring production from Ariel Rechtshaid, Jim-E Stack, and Hill. Another single, titled "Easy Going" with production from Ethan Gruska, Jim-E Stack, and Hill was released on the 24th September. The album, titled Simple, Sweet, and Smiling, was announced for release on 15 October 2021 the same day. The album was met with positive reviews from critics, with Pitchfork describing it as "charming" and "imbued with a sense of lightness". Hill will also embark on her first headlining tour, the Simple, Sweet and Selfish Tour, in promotion of the album, as well as her previous album.

Hill released her first self-produced track "If I Could Say" in June 2022, via web3-based music platform Sound.

Discography

Studio albums

Extended plays

Singles

Guest appearances

References

External links
 Kacy Hill official website
 Fan page on Def Jam Recordings

1994 births
Living people
GOOD Music artists
Musicians from Phoenix, Arizona
21st-century American singers
American women singer-songwriters
Female models from Arizona
Def Jam Recordings artists
American female dancers
Dancers from Arizona
Dancers from California
Musicians from Los Angeles
Singer-songwriters from California
21st-century American women singers
Singer-songwriters from Arizona